Elections were held in Texas on Tuesday, November 2, 2010. Primary elections were held on March 2, 2010.

The Republican Party continued its dominance over Texas politics, maintaining control of all statewide offices and increasing its majorities in both chambers of the Texas Legislature.  The GOP also picked up control of three additional seats in the United States House of Representatives.

Federal

United States House of Representatives 

All 32 Texas seats in the United States House of Representatives were up for election in 2010.

State

Governor

Incumbent Republican Governor Rick Perry ran for re-election against Democratic challenger and former mayor of Houston Bill White and several third-party candidates, and won.

Lieutenant governor
Incumbent Republican Lieutenant Governor David Dewhurst ran for re-election and won.

Attorney general
Incumbent Republican Greg Abbott ran for re-election as Texas Attorney General against Democrat Barbara Ann Radnofsky and Libertarian candidate Jon Roland, and won.

State senate

Approximately half of the 31 seats of the Texas Senate were up for election in 2010.

State House of Representatives

All 150 seats in the Texas House of Representatives were up for election in 2010.  The GOP captured 99 seats (a record), including 22 that were held by Democrats after the 2008 Texas House of Representatives election. This left the Democrats with 51 seats. Edmund Kuempel, the incumbent GOP candidate for District 44 seat, subsequently died; the seat was filled by special election on December 14 and won by his son, John, also a Republican.  Also on December 14, two Democrats (Allan Ritter and Aaron Peña) announced they were switching parties and joining the Republicans, thus giving the GOP 101 seats, and a 2/3 majority in the House, giving them considerable leverage. Under Texas law, any bill which passes with 2/3 of both legislative chambers can become effective immediately upon the governor's signature (otherwise a bill does not become effective until September 1, the start of Texas' fiscal year). This also meant that the Democrats could not quorum bust, or deprive the House of the 2/3 of members required for operation.

Other state offices
Elections were held for the positions of Comptroller of Public Accounts, Commissioner of General Land Office, Commissioner of Agriculture, and Railroad Commissioner in 2010.

Legislative elections

Texas House of Representatives

Texas Senate

Judicial positions
Multiple judicial positions were up for election in 2010, including three justices on the Texas Supreme Court.
Texas judicial elections, 2010 at Judgepedia

Ballot measures
There are no statewide ballot measures in Texas in 2010.

Local
Many elections for county and city offices were also be held on November 2, 2010.

References

External links
Elections Division of the Texas Secretary of State
Texas Candidate List at Imagine Election - Search for candidates by address or zip code
Texas Congressional Races in 2010 for campaign finance data for federal races from OpenSecrets
Texas State Races in 2010 campaign finance data for state races from Follow the Money

 
Texas